NGC 3717 is a spiral galaxy located in the constellation of Hydra at an approximate distance of 81.43 million light years. NGC 3717 was discovered in 1834 by Sir John Herschel.

See also
Spiral galaxy

References

External links

NGC 3717 on SIMBAD

3717
Hydra (constellation)
Spiral galaxies
035539